Albert Lewis Gray (January 29, 1847 – July 28, 1916) was an American dry goods merchant and politician from Fort Howard, Wisconsin.

Life
Gray was born on January 29, 1847, in London, Ontario, Canada. He was married to Jane Kell Howie (1851–1899). He died on July 28, 1916, in Green Bay, Wisconsin and is buried at Fort Howard Memorial Park in Green Bay.

Political career 
Gray spent six non-continuous terms as a member of the Wisconsin State Assembly between 1879 and 1892, first as a member of the Greenbacker party from Green Bay and later as a Democrat, representing Brown County.

In 1906, as a city council member he was arrested and convicted of accepting bribes.

References

External links 

1847 births
1916 deaths
Canadian emigrants to the United States
Businesspeople from Wisconsin
Burials in Wisconsin
People from Green Bay, Wisconsin
Politicians from London, Ontario
Wisconsin Greenbacks
19th-century American politicians
19th-century American businesspeople
Democratic Party members of the Wisconsin State Assembly